East Avenue Historic District is a national historic district located at Rochester in Monroe County, New York. The district consists of a series of large 19th and early 20th century homes, houses of worship, meeting houses, and museums.  It contains approximately 700 structures.  Notable structures in the district include the Hiram W. Sibley House (1868), home of Hiram Sibley; Edward E. Boynton House (1909), Rochester's only work by Frank Lloyd Wright; the Culver House (1805–1816), moved to its present site in 1906; and the Strong-Todd House (1901), once occupied by Henry A. Strong.

It was listed on the National Register of Historic Places in 1979.

The George Eastman House is a National Historic Landmark located within the district.

Gallery

References

External links
All of the following Historic American Buildings Survey (HABS) records are filed under Rochester, Monroe County, NY:

Historic districts in Rochester, New York
Queen Anne architecture in New York (state)
Italianate architecture in New York (state)
Frank Lloyd Wright buildings
Historic districts on the National Register of Historic Places in New York (state)
National Register of Historic Places in Rochester, New York